Serpent Safari was a reptile zoo  located inside the Gurnee Mills Mall in Gurnee, Illinois, a suburb of Chicago. The zoo advertised itself as "America's Finest Reptile Zoo". The zoo housed some rare specimens, including the world's heaviest snake (over 375 lbs. as of February 2010), an albino alligator, and an alligator snapping turtle estimated at a 150 years old. A gift shop offered pets, a photo area where guests could get their photos taken with a large python or boa, and a reptile zoo with guided tours.

A female Burmese Python named "Baby" that lived 27 years at the Serpent Safari was confirmed by Guinness World Records as the heaviest living snake in captivity, weighing . After death, her actual length was determined to be 5.74 m (18 ft 10 in) which is the maximum length record for this species so far.

References

External links
 Official website 
 Serpent Safari closes

1999 establishments in Illinois
Zoos in Illinois